Kemsky District is an administrative district (raion), one of the fifteen in the Republic of Karelia, Russia. It is located in the northeast of the republic. Its administrative center is the town of Kem. As of the 2010 Census, the total population of the district was 17,756, with the population of Kem accounting for 73.5% of that number.

Administrative and municipal status
Within the framework of administrative divisions, Kemsky District is one of the fifteen in the Republic of Karelia and has administrative jurisdiction over one town (Kem) and eighteen rural localities. As a municipal division, the district is incorporated as Kemsky Municipal District. The town of Kem and three rural localities are incorporated into an urban settlement, while the remaining fifteen rural localities are incorporated into three rural settlements within the municipal district. The town of Kem serves as the administrative center of both the administrative and municipal district.

References

Notes

Sources

Districts of the Republic of Karelia
 
